Auma is a town and a former municipality in Thuringia, Germany, today part of Auma-Weidatal.

Auma may also refer to:
AUMA, Adult Use of Marijuana Act, a 2016 voter initiative in California
Auma (river), of Thuringia, Germany
Auma, American Samoa, a village on Tutuila Island
Auma (surname)
Given name:
Rita Auma Obama, Kenyan-British activist